NV Puppis (NV Pup), also known as υ1 Puppis, is a class B2V (blue main-sequence) star in the constellation Puppis. Its apparent magnitude is 4.67 and it is approximately 800 light years away based on parallax.

It is a γ Cas variable, ranging from 4.78 to 4.58 magnitude. It is most likely an optical double with the nearby NW Puppis.

Neither component of this double is given a letter in Lacaille's catalogue or the British Association star catalogue. Gould gave them the designations (Latin letter) v1 and v2 Puppis, but these are rarely used. Lacaille applied the Greek letter υ to the star now called υ Carinae. The designation υ1 first appeared in several catalogues at the end of the 19th century.

References

Puppis
B-type main-sequence stars
Be stars
Gamma Cassiopeiae variable stars
Puppis, Upsilon1
Puppis, NV
CD-36 3512
035363
2787
057150
B-type subgiants